Truth Is Currency is the debut studio album by Rev Theory, who were at the time known as Revelation Theory, released in 2005. It was their first major label album. Julien Jørgensen, one of the bands founding members and guitarist started the Truth is Currency Letters 'Melancholy Missives' in June 2019 to honour the legacy, the blogcast acts as a narrative to past Revelation Theory tunes as well as features nü music and art.

Track listing
All songs written by Julien Jørgensen, except for where noted.
"M367 (Out of Our Hands)" (Jørgensen, Matty McCloskey) – 3:28
"Slowburn" – 3:22
"After the Rain" – 4:00
"Leaving It Up to You" (Brian Howes, Jørgensen) – 3:29
"Selfish and Cold" – 4:31
"Take Away" (Wes Hutchinson, Jørgensen, McCloskey) – 4:06
"Undone" – 3:36
"Loathe" – 3:44
"World to Burn" – 3:47
"Over the Line" (Jørgensen, McCloskey) – 4:09

Singles
March 11, 2006 - "Slowburn" #27 US Mainstream Rock

Personnel
Rich Luzzi – lead vocals
Julien Jørgensen – rhythm guitar
Matty McCloskey – bass, backing vocals
Dave Agoglia – drums

References

External links
[ Billboard website]
Official Rev Theory website

2005 debut albums
Rev Theory albums